Abduwali Ablet (born 17 April 1987) is a Chinese footballer who currently plays for Chinese club Xinjiang Alar 359.

Club career
Abduwali played for China League Two club Xinjiang Sport Lottery between 2006 and 2008. On 18 March 2011, he joined Chinese Super League side Shenzhen Ruby along with his teammate Dilmurat Batur and Yehya Ablikim. He made his senior debut on 29 April 2011 in a 2–0 away defeat against Hangzhou Greentown. Abduwali gained 8 league appearances in his debut season, however, Shenzhen Ruby relegated to the second tier by finishing the last place of the league.

Abduwali transferred to another Super League club Henan Jianye in February 2012. On 25 March, he made his debut for Henan in a 3–0 away league defeat against Guangzhou Evergrande. In September 2014, Abduwali was suspended temporary by the Chinese Football Association due to a positive sample test for Clenbuterol, which maybe result by mistaking beef with Clenbuterol. He returned to field without charge in the 2015 season.

Career statistics 
.

Honours

Club
Henan Jianye
China League One: 2013

References

External links
 

1987 births
Living people
People from Karamay
Chinese footballers
Uyghur sportspeople
Chinese people of Uyghur descent
Footballers from Xinjiang
Association football defenders
Shenzhen F.C. players
Henan Songshan Longmen F.C. players
Chinese Super League players
China League One players
China League Two players
Chinese sportspeople in doping cases